Tyson Slattery (born 3 December 1990) is an Australian rules footballer who was drafted by Essendon in the fifth round of the 2008 AFL Draft. He is the son of Wayne Slattery, a former St Kilda player.

After playing for all of 2009 and most of 2010 for the Bendigo Bombers in the Victorian Football League, Slattery made his AFL debut for Essendon in Round 14 of the 2010 AFL season.  He was involved in a controversial shepherd on Adelaide's Bernie Vince, although no charges were laid.  He dropped back to the VFL the following week, staying there for the rest of the season.

References

External links

Profile at Essendonfc.com.au

1990 births
Living people
Essendon Football Club players
Australian rules footballers from South Australia
West Adelaide Football Club players
Marion Football Club players
Bendigo Football Club players